The  is a Chinese-based Japanese unit of volume. 1 koku is equivalent to 10  or approximately , or about . It converts, in turn, to 100 shō and 1000 gō. One gō is the volume of the "rice cup", the plastic measuring cup that is supplied with commercial Japanese rice cookers.

The koku in Japan was typically used as a dry measure. The amount of rice production measured in koku was the metric by which the magnitude of a feudal domain (han) was evaluated. A feudal lord was only considered daimyō class when his domain amounted to at least 10,000 koku. As a rule of thumb, one koku was considered a sufficient quantity of rice to feed one person for one year.

Chinese equivalent 

The Chinese shi or dan is equal to 10 dou "pecks", 100 sheng "pints". While the current shi is 103 litres in volume, the shi of the Tang dynasty (618–907) period equalled 59.44 litres.

Modern unit 
The exact modern  is calculated to be 180.39 litres, 100 times the capacity of a modern .

Origin of the modern unit 
The , the semi-official one  measuring box since the late 16th century under Daimyo Nobunaga, began to be made in a different (larger) size in the early Edo period, sometime during the 1620s. Its dimensions, given in the traditional Japanese  length unit system, were 4  9  square times 2  7  depth. Its volume, which could be calculated by multiplication was:

1  = 100  = 100 × (49  × 49  × 27 ) = 100 × 64,827 cubic 

Modern measurement enactment 
When the 1891 Japanese  was promulgated, it defined the  unit as the capacity of the standard  of 64827 cubic . The same act also defined the  length as  metre. The metric equivalent of the modern  is  litres. The modern  is therefore  litres, or 180.39 litres.

The modern  defined here is set to equal the so-called  ( or "compromise "), measuring 302.97 mm, a middle-ground value between two different  standards. A researcher has pointed out that the   cups ought to have used  which were 0.2% longer.

Lumber koku 
The "lumber " or "maritime " is defined as equal to 10 cubic  in the lumber or shipping industry, compared with the standard  measures 6.48 cubic . A lumber  is conventionally accepted as equivalent to 120 board feet, but in practice may convert to less.

Historic use 

The exact measure now in use was devised around the 1620s, but not officially adopted for all of Japan until the Kanbun era (1660s).

Feudal Japan 

Under the Tokugawa shogunate (1603–1868) of the Edo period of Japanese history, each feudal domain had an assessment of its potential income known as kokudaka (production yield) which in part determined its order of precedence at the Shogunal court. The smallest kokudaka to qualify the fief-holder for the title of daimyō was 10,000 koku (worth ) and Kaga han, the largest fief (other than that of the shōgun), was called the "million-koku domain". Its holdings totaled around 1,025,000 koku (worth ). Many samurai, including hatamoto (a high-ranking samurai), received stipends in koku, while a few received salaries instead.

The kokudaka was reported in terms of brown rice (genmai) in most places, with the exception of the land ruled by the Satsuma clan which reported in terms of unhusked or non-winnowed rice (. Since this practice had persisted, past Japanese rice production statistics need to be adjusted for comparison with other countries that report production by milled or polished rice.

Even in certain parts of the Tōhoku region or Ezo (Hokkaidō), where rice could not be grown, the economy was still measured in terms of koku, with other crops and produce converted to their equivalent value in terms of rice. The kokudaka was not adjusted from year to year, and thus some fiefs had larger economies than their nominal koku indicated, due to land reclamation and new rice field development, which allowed them to fund development projects.

As measure of cargo ship class 
Koku was also used to measure how much a ship could carry when all its loads were rice.  Smaller ships carried 50 koku while the biggest ships carried over 1,000 koku.  The biggest ships were larger than military vessels owned by the shogunate.

In popular culture 
The Hyakumangoku Matsuri (Million-Koku Festival) in Kanazawa, Japan celebrates the arrival of daimyō Maeda Toshiie into the city in 1583, although Maeda's income was not raised to over a million koku until after the Battle of Sekigahara in 1600.

In fiction 
The James Clavell novel Shōgun uses the Koku measure extensively as a plot device by many of the main characters as a method of reward, punishment and enticement.  While fiction, it shows the importance of the fief, the rice measure and payments.

Explanatory notes

References
Citations

Bibliography

 
 

 
 

Economy of feudal Japan
Human-based units of measurement
Japanese historical terms
Obsolete units of measurement
Units of volume
Standards of Japan